Queen Sono is a South African crime drama streaming television series created by Kagiso Lediga that premiered on Netflix on February 28, 2020. The series stars Pearl Thusi, Vuyo Dabula, Sechaba Morojele, Chi Mhende, Loyiso Madinga, Rob van Vuuren, Kate Liquorish, Khathu Ramabulana, Enhle Maphumulo, Abigail Kubeka, Connie Chiume, Otto Nobela and James Ngcobo And Featuring Mario Diederiks. It is Netflix's first African original series.

Upon release, it received positive reviews by critics, who praised the direction, cinematography, action sequences and the performances, especially Thusi, Dabula and Kubeka, and referred to it as a "smashing good time." On April 28, 2020, Netflix renewed the series for a second season. However, on November 26, 2020, it was reported that Netflix had cancelled the series because of the production challenges brought on by the COVID-19 pandemic.

Synopsis
Queen Sono follows the story of a secret South African clandestine agent who tackles criminal operations while dealing with crises in her personal life.

Cast and characters

Main 
Queen Sono (Pearl Thusi)

A seasoned field operative of the Special Operations Group (SOG) and daughter of Safiya Sono (Lady Skollie), a deceased South African anti-apartheid revolutionary leader and freedom fighter. As a young orphan, Queen struggled to comprehend the mystery surrounding her mother's assassination case. Years later, she is recruited by the SOG, a South African intelligence agency. Determined to find the answers she seeks, she continues to investigate her family's past and uncover the identity of the true culprit responsible for her mother's death.

Shandu Johnson Magwaza (Vuyo Dabula)

An ex-SOG spy and the second-in-command for the Gromova crime family, led by Ekaterina Gromova. Shandu had a past relationship with Queen during their field days and before he left the agency.

Dr. Sidwell Isaacs (Sechaba Morojele)

As Chief Director of the SOG, Dr. Sidwell Isaacs heads the agency, with its mission statement to protect the security and welfare of all African citizens across the continent, by thwarting any future threats that could undermine their country's independence and growth. Currently, his work relationship with Queen is quite fraught owing to a lack of trust, evident by his withholding of pertinent intel that would shed the light on the real truth surrounding Safiya's murder case.

Miri Dube (Chi Mhende)

As Director General of the SOG, Miri is a target oriented, no-nonsense and ambitious senior officer, tasked to oversee Queen's performance on the field during debriefings. Although, she sympathizes with Queen's difficult past, she is often at odds with the agent due to their differing philosophy in handling covert missions.

Frederique Kazadi (Loyiso Madinga)

A former hacker and current lead field technician of the SOG. Fred assists Queen with her missions by monitoring her location and providing tech support on field.

Viljoen (Rob van Vuuren)

A former SOG field agent, who later became an analyst after suffering a permanent impairment injury from a past covert operation. He is on friendly terms with Queen.

Ekaterina Gromova (Kate Liquorish)

A high level security contractor and primary owner of the private military company Superior Solutions, as well as a Russian heiress to the Gromova crime family. During her formative years, Ekaterine was never treated with respect by her family members. Often derided by her father, she was consistently pushed aside in favor of her brother Vitaly Gromova, who was later poised to take control of the Gromova empire. After her father's death, she plans to take charge of the family oligarch and exploit various opportunities to position Super Solutions as a leading military contractor within the African continent.

William Chakela (Khathu Ramabulana)

As Queen's most trusted confidant, William also acts as her on-call therapist. As a long time childhood friend, he is one of the few people, she tries to protect and will listen to.

Nova (Enhle Maphumulo)

William's girlfriend, who works as a consultant at the World Bank.

Mazet (Abigail Kubeka)

She is Queen's paternal grandmother.

Nana (Connie Chiume)

Miri's mother, who is a prominent South African key political advisor.

President Malunga (James Ngcobo)

A South African politician, who was investigated for corruption in his earlier days as Deputy President of South Africa.

Bula Bule (Otto Nobela)

A representative of the rebel group Watu Wema and one of Ekaterina's mercenaries.

Hendrikus's Cousin With Beard (Mario Diederiks)

A Cousin of the murderer  (Hendrikus) who assassinated Queen's mother - Safiya Sono

Episodes

Production

Development
On December 10, 2018, it was announced that Netflix had given the production a series order for a six-episode first season.
The series is created by Kagiso Lediga who is credited as an executive producer alongside Tamsin Andersson. Lediga and Tebogo Malope directed the entirety of the first season. Diprente Films was involved in the production of the series. The first season was released on February 28, 2020. On April 28, 2020, the series was renewed by Netflix for a second season. It was reported on November 26, 2020 that the show had been cancelled, the complications of the pandemic having led to cost increases and difficulty scheduling production.

Casting
Alongside the series order announcement, it was confirmed that Pearl Thusi would star in the lead role. On June 11, 2019, it was announced Vuyo Dabula, Sechaba Morojele, Chi Mhende, Loyiso Madinga, Rob van Vuuren, Kate Liquorish, Khathu Ramabulana, Enhle Maphumulo, Abigail Kubeka, Connie Chiume, Otto Nobelaand James Ngcobo had joined the cast.

Filming
Principal photography for the first season was originally scheduled to commence in April 2019. Filming for the first season took place on location in Johannesburg, South Africa, Lagos, Nigeria, Kenya and Zanzibar, Tanzania from June 2019 to August 2019.

Release

On December 10, 2019, an announcement teaser trailer for the series was released by Netflix. On January 30, 2020, Netflix released the official trailer for the series.

Reception
The first season received positive reviews upon its release. The review aggregator website Rotten Tomatoes reported a 91% approval rating with an average rating of 7/10 based on 11 reviews. The website's critical consensus reads, "Queen Sono's twisty, taut thrills are matched with epic action sequences and soapy delights, making Netflix's first South African series a smashing good time." Metacritic, which uses a weighted average, assigned the first season a score of 70 out of 100 based on 5 critics, indicating "generally favorable" reviews.

Notes

References

External links

2020 South African television series debuts
2020 South African television series endings
2020s South African television series
Television productions cancelled due to the COVID-19 pandemic
South African drama television series
2020s crime drama television series
Thriller television series
Serial drama television series
Espionage television series
Spy thriller television series
Post-traumatic stress disorder in fiction
Murder in television
Television shows set in South Africa
Television shows set in Johannesburg, South Africa
Television shows set in Kenya
Television shows filmed in South Africa
Television shows filmed in Kenya
Television shows filmed in Tanzania
Television shows filmed in Nigeria
Television shows set in Nigeria
Television shows set in Lagos
Television shows set in Africa
English-language Netflix original programming
French-language Netflix original programming
Russian-language Netflix original programming
Works about the Russian Mafia